Terrique Anderson (born 11 November 1998) is an English professional footballer. He is currently a free agent.

Career statistics

References

English footballers
1998 births
Living people
Association football midfielders
Charlton Athletic F.C. players